"London" is a song by English synth-pop duo Pet Shop Boys, released on 14 October 2002 as the third and final single from their eighth studio album, Release (2002). It was released exclusively in Germany and Europe and as a promotional-only release in the United Kingdom.

The single cover features a pigeon, possibly a reference to the city of London itself. The European CD single has Pet Shop Boys written in green, whilst the German CD single has it written in pink. It was designed by Scott King.

The B-side to the single, "Positive Role Model", was later included on the duo's remix album Disco 3 (2003).

Music video
The music video for "London" features two men (who appear to be the people described in the song) acting out the lyrics of the song in the city of London. Tennant and Lowe are also seen busking on the streets and in the Underground. One man is Alexei Akinfiev, the other is unknown. It was directed by Martin Parr.

Track listings
All tracks written by Tennant, Lowe, and Zippel, except where noted.

German CD maxi single
 "London" (Berlin radio mix) – 3:52  (mixed by Chris Zippel and Kai Diener)
 "Positive Role Model" – 4:05  (Tennant, Lowe, Barry White, Peter Sterling, Tony Sepe)
 "London" (Genuine Piano mix) – 4:16  (mixed by Chris Zippel)

European CD maxi single
 "London" (Westbam In Berlin mix) – 5:43  (remixed by Klaus Jankuhn and Westbam)
 "London" (Thee Radikal Blaklite mix) – 8:31  (remixed by Felix da Housecat)
 "London" (Thee Radikal dub) – 8:17  (remixed by Felix da Housecat)

UK promotional CD single
 "London" (Berlin radio mix) – 3:52  (mixed by Chris Zippel and Kai Diener)
 "London" (Genuine Piano mix) – 4:16 (mixed by Chris Zippel)

German promotional 12-inch single
 "London" (Westbam In Berlin mix) – 5:43  (remixed by Klaus Jankuhn and Westbam)
 "London" (Thee Radikal Blaklite mix) – 8:31  (remixed by Felix da Housecat)

Charts

References

2002 singles
2002 songs
Parlophone singles
Pet Shop Boys songs
Songs about London
Songs written by Chris Lowe
Songs written by Neil Tennant